SECR or SE&CR may refer to

South Eastern and Chatham Railway in the United Kingdom
the SECR N class locomotive operated on the South Eastern and Chatham Railway
the South East Central Railway zone in India
Streamlined Energy and Carbon Reporting, a mandatory form of carbon accounting in the United Kingdom